Sarll is a surname. Notable people with this surname include:

 Billy Sarll (1899–1982), Australian Australian rules football player
 Darren Sarll (born 1983), English football manager and coach
 Tiger Sarll (1882–1977), British army captain and war correspondent